France–Taiwan relations are bilateral relations between France (officially the French Republic) and Taiwan (officially the Republic of China).

History

Qing dynasty

During the Sino-French War in 1884, French warships entered Taiwan seas and disrupted coastal provinces. 

Meanwhile, the French decided to put pressure on China by landing an expeditionary corps in northern Taiwan to seize Keelung and Tamsui, redeeming the failure of 6 August and finally winning the 'pledge' they sought. On 1 October Lieutenant-Colonel Bertaux-Levillain landed at Keelung with a force of 1,800 marine infantry, forcing the Chinese to withdraw to strong defensive positions which had been prepared in the surrounding hills. The French force was too small to advance beyond Keelung, and the Pei-tao coal mines remained in Chinese hands. Meanwhile, after an ineffective naval bombardment on 2 October, Admiral Lespès attacked the Chinese defences at Tamsui with 600 sailors from his squadron's landing companies on 8 October, and was decisively repulsed by forces under the command of the Fujianese general Sun Kaihua (孫開華). As a result of this reverse, French control over Formosa was limited merely to the town of Keelung. This achievement fell far short of what had been hoped for.

Japanese colonial rule

During Japanese colonial rule, the Vichy regime opened a consulate in Taihoku in February 1942.

Republic of China

Early years
The French Third Republic recognized the establishment of the Republic of China and established diplomatic relations with the Beiyang government on 7October 1913. The Institut Franco Chinoise de Lyon (1921—1951) promoted cultural exchanges.

During World War II, Free France and the Nationalist government, who had overthrown the Beiyang and the warlords, fought as allied powers against the Axis powers of Germany, Italy and Japan. After the invasion of France in 1940, although the newly formed Vichy France was an ally of Germany, it continued to recognize the Kuomintang government of Chiang Kai-shek—which had to flee to Chongqing in the Chinese interior after the fall of Nanjing in 1937—rather than the Japanese-sponsored Reorganized National Government of China under Wang Jingwei. French diplomats in China remained accredited to the government in Chongqing.

Cold War
After the Chinese Civil War and the establishment of the new communist-led People's Republic of China (PRC) on 1 October 1949, the French Fourth Republic government refused to recognize the PRC after the ROC government retreated to Taiwan. However, by 1964 France and the PRC officially established ambassadorial level diplomatic relations ending relations with the ROC. This was precipitated by Charles de Gaulle's official recognition of the PRC.

Recent history
In 2016, a delegation of French legislators led by Francois de Rugy visited Taiwan.

In 2018, China made accusations against France after a French naval vessel transited the Taiwan Strait.

In December 2020, Taiwan opened its second representative office in France, in Aix-en-Provence.

In October 2021, a delegation of French senators visited Taiwan.

In November 2021, the French parliament passed a resolution which called on the French government to support Taiwan's participation in international organizations. The Taiwanese government praised the resolution.

In December 2021, a delegation of lawmakers from the French National Assembly visited Taiwan.

Military relations
Defense relations between France and Taiwan have been significant with Taiwan acquiring a number of major weapons platforms from France.

Scandals

Taiwan frigate scandal

The Taiwan frigate deal was a huge political scandal, both in Taiwan and France. Eight people involved in the contract died in unusual and possibly suspicious circumstances. Arms dealer Andrew Wang fled Taiwan to the UK after the body of presumptive whistleblower Captain Yin Ching-feng was found floating in the sea. In 2001, Swiss authorities froze accounts held by Andrew Wang and his family in connection to the Taiwan frigate scandal.

See also 
 Taipei Representative Office in France
 French Office in Taipei
 Taiwan–European Union relations

References 

France–Taiwan relations
Taiwan
Bilateral relations of Taiwan